Cosmonaut Keep is a science fiction novel by Scottish writer Ken MacLeod, published in 2000.
It is the first book in the Engines of Light Trilogy, a 2001 nominee for the Arthur C. Clarke Award, and a 2002 Hugo Award Nominee for best novel.

Reception

Publishers Weekly had mostly praise for the novel saying:

Reference in other work

In Cosmonaut Keep, MacLeod makes fleeting reference to a future programmers' union called the "Information Workers of the World Wide Web", or the Webblies, a reference to the Industrial Workers of the World, who are nicknamed the Wobblies. The idea of the Webblies formed a central part of a later novel For the Win by Cory Doctorow, where it is given much greater prominence. MacLeod is acknowledged by Doctorow as coining the terms.

References

External links

 Cosmonaut Keep at Worlds Without End

2000 British novels
2000 science fiction novels
Novels by Ken MacLeod
Orbit Books books